Worlds is a novel written by Joe Haldeman and published in 1981.

Plot summary
Worlds is a novel in which Marianne O'Hara takes educational trip from orbital New New York to old Earth, and an international terrorist conspiracy nearly kills everyone.

Reception
Colin Greenland reviewed Worlds for Imagine magazine, and stated that "It feels perverse to say that a series about the near extinction of the human race seems uneventful, but somehow it does. The futuristic detail is fascinating, but Haldeman relates it in a casual, rambling way that dilutes much of its drama."

Reviews
Review by Jeff Frane (1981) in Locus, #242 March 1981
Review by Algis Budrys (1981) in The Magazine of Fantasy & Science Fiction, August 1981
Review by Spider Robinson (1981) in Analog Science Fiction/Science Fact, August 17, 1981
Review by Andrew Andrews (1982) in Science Fiction Review, Spring 1982
Review by Gene DeWeese (1982) in Science Fiction Review, Fall 1982
Review by Chris Henderson (1982) in Whispers #17-18, August 1982
Review by Tom Easton (1982) in Analog Science Fiction/Science Fact, November 1982
Review by David Pettus (1983) in Thrust, #19, Winter/Spring 1983
Review by uncredited (2002) in Vector 224

References

1981 novels